Sonia Gazi is a Bangladeshi model and beauty pageant titleholder.

References

Bangladeshi beauty pageant winners
Bangladeshi female models
Living people
Year of birth missing (living people)